The 1962 German Grand Prix was a Formula One motor race held at the Nürburgring on 5 August 1962. It was race 6 of 9 in both the 1962 World Championship of Drivers and the 1962 International Cup for Formula One Manufacturers. The 15-lap race was won by BRM driver Graham Hill after he started from second position. John Surtees finished second for the Lola team and Porsche driver Dan Gurney came in third. The race was notable for having six different constructors taking the first six positions.

Race

After a heavy midday downpour, the race was delayed by over an hour as streams of water and mud covered parts of the track. It never dried fully, and the race was run in wet conditions. Graham Hill drove masterfully in the wet conditions, followed by John Surtees who was gradually proving himself a great driver. He reached third position in the championship with this race, but was not to score any more points in 1962. Dan Gurney's Porsche had less than impressive handling but he finished third after passing Phil Hill, whose Ferrari was doing much better than at Aintree just 2 weeks prior. Hill, however, had to pit with oil on his visor and retired with a broken rear suspension soon thereafter. After a disastrous strike had kept them out of the last two races, Ferrari returned in force with four 156s built to different specifications. Hill had the newest version, with a six-speed transmission mounted fore of the engine. Giancarlo Baghetti drove a car with the usual transmission and finished tenth, whereas Ricardo Rodríguez drove last year's model with the 65 degree Tipo 188 engine - and got the best result of the team, finishing sixth. Lorenzo Bandini used a development car, with a regular nosecone, smaller radiator, and modified front and rear suspension. He crashed on the third lap, while in eleventh position.

Jim Clark absentmindedly forgot to turn on the fuel pump at the start, losing thirteen seconds and being in 26th place after the start. A rapid climb began, and he passed seventeen cars on the opening lap. He was closing in to the leaders with three to four seconds per lap, but after a few near crashes in the middle of the race he chose to ease off the pace a bit. Clark finished fourth, ahead of Bruce McLaren in a V8 Cooper. The other V8-engined Cooper was driven in practice by Tony Maggs, but a German TV-company's camera fell off Carel Godin de Beaufort's Porsche in practice, causing Graham Hill and Maggs to crash and total their cars. Maggs ran a Climax-engined backup car and finished ninth. The Grand Prix Drivers' Association's policy was to not carry cameras due to the safety risks, but de Beaufort was not a member.

Three new cars appeared in this race; the new BRM V8-engined Gilby, driven by Keith Greene, retired after about half the race with gearbox problems. The Belgian Maserati-engined ENB finished last; this car was a hodgepodge of parts from three old Emerysons equipped with a sharknose-style front end. This was its only appearance, and a hard worked Lucien Bianchi was only allowed to start thanks to the fact that several faster racers had not finished the minimum-required five laps. Gurney's fastest qualifying lap was 8:47.2; the ENB's fastest lap was 10:40.7, nearly two minutes slower. Most importantly, Jack Brabham's new BT3 finally appeared after a marathon effort by his mechanics. He spun the main bearings on the first day practice, and qualified with an engine built using parts from Trevor Taylor's car (his engine bent a valve). He started the race from the rear of the field, with the Climax engine from his Lotus 24. He climbed to ninth place by the end of the first lap, but then his throttle broke and he had to retire after nine laps. Nonetheless, Brabham was happy with the car, particularly the handling.

Classification

Qualifying 

Notes
  – Four drivers were not allowed to start, as race organisers deemed they had not completed sufficient laps in practice. Trevor Taylor was eventually allowed, but was demoted to the back of the field.
 †  – Maggs switched from his V8 primary machine to a four-cylinder back-up car after a crash during the second practice. His time during the third practice session was the only one that counted towards the grid.

Race

Championship standings after the race

Drivers' Championship standings

Constructors' Championship standings

 Notes: Only the top five positions are included for both sets of standings. Only the best five results counted towards the Championship. Numbers without parentheses are Championship points; numbers in parentheses are total points scored.

References

External links
 

German Grand Prix
German Grand Prix
German Grand Prix